Kenneth John Earl (10 November 1925 – 13 October 1986) was an English cricketer. Earl was a right-handed batsman who bowled right-arm fast-medium. He was born in Low Fell, Gateshead, County Durham. 
Earl was married to Barbara and had two sons, Alex (b1977) and James (b1982). Alex lives in Alberta, Canada, and James in Yorkshire, England.

References

External links
Ken Earl at ESPNcricinfo
Ken Earl at CricketArchive

1925 births
1986 deaths
Cricketers from Gateshead
English cricketers
Northumberland cricketers
Minor Counties cricketers